The Ascom EasyTicket is a railway ticket issuing system used in Britain, consisting of a series of self-service (passenger-operated) machines at railway stations.  Having been introduced in 2003 on a trial basis by several Train Operating Companies (TOCs) at various stations, the system did not spread into common usage, and most machines have since been removed.

Company details
Ascom AG was created in 1987 through a merger between three major telecommunications companies in Switzerland, although its origins can ultimately be traced back to the establishment of the Swiss Federal Telegraph Workshops in 1852.  The Autelca AG division, which had been acquired in 1963 by one of Ascom AG's constituent companies, was involved in the manufacture of ticket vending machines (TVMs); it provided British Rail with the B8050 self-service machine, hundreds of which were installed at stations across Britain from 1989 onwards.

The EasyTicket system was developed while the Transport Revenue division, as it was then known, was still under Ascom's ownership; but as part of an attempt to focus on the telecommunications sector, the division was sold in August 2005 to Affiliated Computer Services, Inc for 130 million Swiss Francs.

Origins
The company's first attempt to move on from the successful B8050 machine was the B8070, a small evolutionary upgrade initially developed and delivered in 1999.  In the meantime, however, a more significant, revolutionary design solution was being sought: Ascom realised that the late-1980s B8050 technology was no longer suitable for the modern railway environment, given the increasing use of credit and other payment cards, the anticipated adoption of the Chip and PIN secure-payments system, new disability regulations and the effects privatisation had on fragmenting and expanding the fare structure on Britain's railways.

The EasyTicket system (official code number TIS9000) was developed with these considerations in mind, and features:
 Two different machine heights, with one having a specially lowered screen, coin/card slots and ticket dispenser suitable for wheelchair users
 Touch-screen technology with a series of sub-menus
 Instructions in six different languages, selectable at the start of the transaction process
 Cash-and-card and card-only models

Installation programme
Machines began to be installed on a trial basis in March 2003, with a single machine (low-height, cash-and-card version) at Gatwick Airport station.  More followed, as shown: (Train Operating Company names are those current at the time of installation)

Following the trial at Gatwick Airport, Gatwick Express, the Train Operating Company responsible for providing ticketing facilities at Gatwick Airport and London Victoria, elected to install an additional five at the former and one at the latter.  There were previously six Ascom B8050 machines at Gatwick Airport, so this turned out to be a like-for-like replacement.  The machine at London Victoria is close to the Gatwick Express ticket office windows on the dedicated Express platforms; there were two B8050 machines there until around 1991.

References

External links
List of Ascom EasyTicket machines as of 2004, with dates of installation
Picture of cash-and-card machine at East Croydon
Picture of card-only machine at East Croydon

Fare collection systems in the United Kingdom
Travel technology